Insurgency in Malaya may refer to one of the following Communist insurgencies:
 The Malayan Emergency from 1948 until 1960
 Communist insurgency in Malaysia (1968–89)